Peter Hein is an Indian action choreographer and stunt coordinator who works in Tamil, Telugu, Malayalam, Hindi and Kannada language films. He is best known for his action sequences in the films such as Anniyan (2005), Athadu (2005), Chatrapathi (2005), Sivaji (2007), Ghajini (2008), Magadheera (2009), Enthiran (2010), Ranna (2015), 7aum Arivu (2011), Baahubali (2015), Pulimurugan (2016) Odiyan (2018), Madhura Raja (2019) and Jack & Daniel (2019). Stunt masters such as Ram Laxman, Anal Arasu, Silva, Dhilip Subbarayan, Anbariv, Hari Dinesh and Pradeep Dinesh have worked as fighters and assistants to him.

He was nominated for the Taurus World Stunt Award against Hollywood choreographers. He received a Filmfare Award for Best Action for his work in Ghajini. He was the first recipient of the National Film Award for Best Stunt Choreographer for his work in Pulimurugan.

Early life and career
He was born in Karaikal, Puducherry, India to a Tamil father and Vietnamese mother. He grew up in Chennai's Vadapalani neighbourhood. His father, Perumal, worked as an assistant fight master in Tamil films. Later, Peter started his career as an extra fighter and assistant fight master for many Tamil, Telugu and Malayalam films. During the initial days of his career, he worked as assistant to action directors Kanal Kannan and Vijayan. During his early days he was body double for heroes as well as heroines.

His debut film as "fight master " was in Gautham Vasudev Menon's debut directorial Minnale (2001). Krishna Vamsi, a Telugu film director recognised his sincerity and dedication and offered him the chance to direct the action sequences for the film Murari which was also dubbed into Tamil. From then on, he became a full-length action film director, action co-ordinator and stunt director for various Telugu and Tamil films.

He acquired recognition from critics and media for his work in several films such as Anji, Run, and Kaakha Kaakha and it was his work in films such as Varsham, Anniyan, Athadu, Chatrapati and so on that brought him critical acclaim. Ram Gopal Varma introduced him to Bollywood with the film James. Mani Ratnam was very much impressed with his work in films like Athadu, Anniyan and Sivaji and enrolled him to direct the stunt sequences for the film Raavan. However, due to scheduling conflicts with Magadheera, Hein has done limited work for Raavan. He was the first recipient of the National Film Award for Best Stunt Choreographer for his work in Pulimurugan (2016). He also directed the 2021 Indo-Vietnamese film Sám Hối: The Living Sandbag.

Filmography

Actor

Extra fighter

Assistant
 Raavanaprabhu (2001) – Second assistant; choreographed Mohanlal v Siddique fight scene.

Awards
Won
 2002 Dinakaran Award for Best Stunt Master - Run
 2004 Tamil Nadu State Film Award for Best Stunt Coordinator – Bose
 2005 Filmfare Award for Best Action Director - South – Anniyan
 2010 Edison Awards – Enthiran: The Robot
 2011 Tamil Nadu State Film Award for Best Stunt Coordinator – Ko
 2011 South Indian International Movie Awards: Sensation of South Indian cinema
 2011 Norway Tamil Film Festival Award for Best Stunt Choreographer - Ko
 2015 Nandi Award for Best Fight Master - Baahubali: The Beginning
 2016 National Film Award for Best Stunt Choreographer – Pulimurugan
 2017 Special jury award-19th Asianet film awards
 2019 Norway Tamil Film Festival Award for Best Stunt Choreographer - Asuran
 2021 V4 Entertainers Award for Best Stunt Director - Darbar

Nominated
 2007 Vijay Award for Best Stunt Director – Sivaji: The Boss
 2010 Taurus World Stunt Award for Best Action in a Foreign Film – Raavanan
 2010 Vijay Award for Best Stunt Director – Enthiran: The Robot
 2011 Vijay Award for Best Stunt Director – 7aum Arivu
 2012 Vijay Award for Best Stunt Director – Maattrraan
 2012 South Indian International Movie Awards for Best Fight Choreographer – Maattrraan
 2016 Asianet Film Awards Special Jury Award – '"Pulimurugan''
 2017 Edison Awards - Spyder

References

External links

Male actors from Puducherry
Tamil male actors
Living people
Male actors from Chennai
Indian people of Vietnamese descent
Filmfare Awards South winners
Indian action choreographers
People from Karaikal
Male actors in Tamil cinema
Male actors in Telugu cinema
Indian male film actors
Male actors in Malayalam cinema
20th-century Indian male actors
21st-century Indian male actors
Film directors from Puducherry
1962 births